Whitehouse v Lemon is a 1977 court case involving the blasphemy law in the United Kingdom. It was the last successful blasphemy trial in the UK.

Facts 
James Kirkup's poem "The Love that Dares to Speak its Name" was published in the 3 June 1976 issue of Gay News. The poem, written from the viewpoint of a Roman centurion, graphically describes him having sex with Jesus after his crucifixion, and also claims that Jesus had had sex with numerous disciples, guards, and even Pontius Pilate.

In early November 1976, Mary Whitehouse obtained a copy of the poem and announced her intention to bring a private prosecution against the magazine. Leave to bring this prosecution was granted on 9 December 1976. The charges named Gay News Ltd and Denis Lemon as the publishers. A charge against Moore Harness Ltd for distributing was subsequently dropped. The indictment described the offending publication as "a blasphemous libel concerning the Christian religion, namely an obscene poem and illustration vilifying Christ in his life and in his crucifixion".

The Gay News Fighting Fund was set up in December 1976. Judge Alan King-Hamilton QC heard the trial at the Old Bailey on 4 July 1977, with John Mortimer QC and Geoffrey Robertson QC representing the accused and John Smyth representing Mary Whitehouse. On Monday 11 July, the jury found both defendants guilty. Gay News Ltd was fined £1,000. Denis Lemon was fined £500 and sentenced to nine months' imprisonment suspended. It had been "touch and go", said the judge, whether he would actually send Denis Lemon to jail.

Mary Whitehouse's costs of £7,763 were ordered to be paid four-fifths by Gay News Ltd and one-fifth by Lemon. Gay News Ltd and Denis Lemon appealed against conviction and sentence. On 17 March 1978, the Court of Appeal quashed Denis Lemon's suspended prison sentence but upheld the convictions on the basis that the law of blasphemy had been developed before mens rea, literally, a "guilty mind", became an essential element of a crime. Gay News readers voted by a majority of 20 to 1 in favour of appealing to the House of Lords. The Law Lords heard the appeal against conviction and delivered their judgment on 21 February 1979.

At issue was whether or not the offence of blasphemous libel required specific intent of committing such a blasphemy. By a majority of 3 to 2, the Lords concluded that intention was not required. Lord Scarman was of the opinion that blasphemy laws should cover all religions and not just Christianity and sought strict liability for those who "cause grave offence to the religious feelings of some of their fellow citizens or are such as to tend to deprave and corrupt persons who are likely to read them". The appeal was lost.

"The Love That Dares to Speak Its Name"
"The Love That Dares to Speak Its Name" is a controversial poem by James Kirkup published in 1976, which was at the centre of the Whitehouse v. Lemon trial.

It is written from the viewpoint of a Roman centurion who is graphically described having sex with Jesus after his crucifixion, and also claims that Jesus had had sex with numerous disciples, guards, and even Pontius Pilate. The poem itself was considered of low artistic value, both by critics and the author himself.
 
In 2002, a deliberate and well-publicised public repeat reading of the poem took place on the steps of St Martin-in-the-Fields church in Trafalgar Square, without any incidents. Kirkup criticized the politicizing of his poem.

Judgment
The European Commission of Human Rights declared the case inadmissible to be heard by the European Court of Human Rights on 7 May 1982. The £26,435 raised by the Gay News Fighting Fund through benefits and donations from the gay community and others, including a £500 donation from Monty Python, was sufficient to cover the costs of the trial and appeals.

Abolition of blasphemous libel as an offence
Blasphemous libel ceased to be a common law offence in England and Wales with the passing of the Criminal Justice and Immigration Act 2008.

See also
Blasphemy law in the United Kingdom
John William Gott

References
Cited as Whitehouse v Lemon [1979] 2 WLR 281; or Whitehouse v Gay News Ltd [1979] AC 617, HL
Gay News Ltd. and Lemon v United Kingdom [Eur Comm HR] 5 EHRR 123 (1982), App. No. 8710/79.

Further reading
Gay News on Trial, Gay and Lesbian Humanist.
Robertson, Geoffrey: The Justice Game Vintage (1999); .
The gay poem that broke blasphemy laws (10 January 2008) - summary of the case by PinkNews

Article 10 of the European Convention on Human Rights
European Court of Human Rights cases involving the United Kingdom
United Kingdom free speech case law
United Kingdom LGBT rights case law
House of Lords cases
Religion in England
1977 in British law
1977 in case law
Blasphemy law
1977 in LGBT history
Blasphemy law in Europe
1977 in England